Located at 315 Avenue A, the Old Fort Pierce City Hall (also known as the Old City Hall) is a historic building in downtown Fort Pierce, Florida. Designed with both Mediterranean Revival Style and Italian Renaissance Revival elements by architect William Hatcher, the structure was built in 1925 at the peak of the Florida land boom by builder C.E. Cahow.

The building was used as the Fort Pierce City Hall until 1983. It was restored in 1995 for $500,000, being the first of many of Fort Pierce's successes in preservation. On December 7, 2001, it was added to the U.S. National Register of Historic Places.

See also 
 Sunrise Theatre: a nearby structure also built by C.E. Cahow

References

External links
 Old Fort Pierce City Hall at Florida's Office of Cultural and Historical Programs
 Main Street Fort Pierce Florida - Old City Hall

City and town halls in Florida
Old Fort Pierce City Hall
Buildings and structures in St. Lucie County, Florida
National Register of Historic Places in St. Lucie County, Florida
Old Fort Pierce City Hall
Old Fort Pierce City Hall
City and town halls on the National Register of Historic Places in Florida
1925 establishments in Florida
Government buildings completed in 1925